Dharam Singh (1666–1708), born as Dharam Das, was one of the original Panj Pyare or the Five Beloved, the forerunners of the Khalsa.  He was the son of Chaudhary Sant Ram and Mai Sabho of the village Hastinapur (modern-day Meerut District, Uttar Pradesh, India). He was born into the Jat caste. Originally said to be fourth position of the inaugural group of Panj Pyare according to older historical sources, he was upgraded to second in-position by later sources.

References 

Kuir Singh, Gurbilas Patshahi 10. Patiala, 1968
Chhibbar, Kesar Singh, Bansavalinama Das Patshahian Ka. Chandigarh, 1972
Santokh Singh, Bhai, Gur Pratap Suraj Granth. Amritsar 1926-37
Macauliffe, Max Arthur, The Sikh Religion. Oxford, 1909
Harbans Singh, Guru Gobind Singh. Chandigarh, 1966

Indian Sikhs
1666 births
1708 deaths
People from Uttar Pradesh